The number 443 may refer to:

 443 AD
 443 BC
 
 Area code 443, in the state of Maryland
 MP-443 Grach, a Russian pistol
 TCP port 443, the default port for HTTPS network traffic

See also 
 List of highways numbered 443